Storuman Airport  is an airport about 35 km east of Storuman, Sweden, in the small village of Gunnarn. It had 12,753 passengers in 2006 but since June 2010 there is no scheduled traffic anymore.

History
It was built as a military airbase (called Gunnarn), hence the relatively long runway. Scheduled passenger traffic to Stockholm began in 1993.

The government and the relevant authority decided not to support the traffic financially from autumn 2008. The reason is that the Vilhelmina Airport is located only 75 km (47 mi) from Storuman centre. Air traffic cannot continue without public financial support. The municipality thought it was important to have its own airport so it financed an operator itself from 2009. On 18 January 2010, Storuman Municipality decided to stop supporting the air traffic and to end the agreement with Avion Express. Traffic continued with only one flight per day until June 2010 when all scheduled traffic ended. Since 2018, flights from Vilhelmina make a landing at Lycksele Airport, making a drive (110 km/68 mi) to Lycksele the fastest way of travelling from Storuman to Stockholm.

Statistics

See also
 List of the largest airports in the Nordic countries

References

External links
Official web site

Airports in Sweden
Buildings and structures in Västerbotten County